The 2016–17 Louisville Cardinals women's basketball team represented the University of Louisville during the 2016–17 NCAA Division I women's basketball season. The Cardinals, led by tenth-year head coach Jeff Walz, played their home games at the KFC Yum! Center and were in their third year in the Atlantic Coast Conference. They finished the season 29–8, 12–4 in ACC play to finish in a tie for fourth place. They advanced to the semifinals of the ACC women's tournament where they lost to Notre Dame. They received an at-large bid to the NCAA women's tournament where they defeated Chattanooga and Tennessee in the first and second rounds before losing to Baylor in the Sweet Sixteen.

Roster

Media
Once again select Cardinals games will be broadcast on WHAS. Some of the games will be on the ACC RSN. Additional ACC games will air on ESPN3.

All Cardinals basketball games will air on Learfield Sports on WKRD 790 AM or WVKY 101.7 FM, depending on conflicts with Louisville and Kentucky football and men's basketball games.

Schedule

|-
!colspan=9 style="background:#000000; color:#D81E05;"| Exhibition

|-
!colspan=9 style="background:#000000; color:#D81E05;"| Regular season

|-
!colspan=9 style="background:#000000;"| ACC Women's Tournament

|-
!colspan=9 style="background:#000000;"| NCAA Women's Tournament

Source

Rankings
2016–17 NCAA Division I women's basketball rankings

See also
2016–17 Louisville Cardinals men's basketball team

References

Louisville Cardinals women's basketball seasons
Louisville
Louisville Cardinals women's basketball, 2016-17
Louisville Cardinals women's basketball, 2016-17
Louisville